Barnabas Zhang (11 February 1882 – 25 January 1961), was an early pioneer of the Chinese indigenous True Jesus Church.

Biography 
Originally known as Zhang Dianju, he was born in Weixian, Shandong Province, and worked as a collector of antiques. He was first introduced to the True Jesus Church through his relative Zhang Lingsheng, who came and proselytized in his hometown of Weixian. After hearing Zhang Lingsheng's preaching, Zhang Dianju, a Presbyterian, received the baptism of the Holy Spirit and began to speak in tongues on 16 March 1912.

Paul Wei, often considered the founder of the True Jesus Church, would likewise travel to Weixian in spring 1919. He actively proselytized to members of local Presbyterian churches, establishing local branches of the True Jesus Church. Wei ordained Zhang Lingsheng as bishop of Shandong and Zhang Dianju as elder, and all three would travel throughout many provinces of China and draw in over a thousand members, most of whom came from existing independent, Pentecostal, Seventh Day Adventist, or mainline churches. Many of these new converts would take on new names, including Zhang Dianju who would now be known as Barnabas Zhang.

However, a growing north–south schism developed between the two leaders with Isaac Wei being influential in northern China and Barnabas Zhang becoming increasingly influential in the southern provinces of Fujian and Guangdong, as well as in Taiwan and Chinese communities in Malaya. In a general assembly in 1930, Barnabas Zhang was excommunicated, placing the church under the leadership of Isaac Wei. However, Barnabas Zhang would still lead a number of followers in southern China and southeast Asia under the name the China True Jesus Church until his death.

Barnabas died in Singapore on 25 January 1961.

Notes

References

External links
True Jesus Mission

1882 births
1961 deaths
People excommunicated by Christian churches
True Jesus Church
People from Weifang